The 2023 New Zealand Labour Party leadership election was held on 22 January 2023 to choose the next leader of the New Zealand Labour Party. The election was triggered by the resignation of Prime Minister and Labour Party Leader Jacinda Ardern, which was announced on 19 January 2023. 

With Chris Hipkins as the only candidate, he won the election by default. He was confirmed as leader on the afternoon of 22 January, with Ardern's deputy leader Kelvin Davis confirmed as continuing in his role.

Background 
Jacinda Ardern served as leader of the Labour Party after winning the 2017 leadership election. She announced her resignation as leader of the Labour Party in a televised statement on 19 January 2023, stating that she no longer had sufficient energy for the demands of the role. She indicated that she would formally step down no later than 7 February 2023. Because the Labour Party won the 2020 general election, the incoming Labour Party leader became the 41st Prime Minister of New Zealand.

Process and outcome 
The leadership election was the first to be held under new rules agreed by the party in 2021. Candidates needed 10% of the caucus (seven MPs) to nominate. The caucus (64 Labour MPs) votes via exhaustive ballot, and a candidate would require the support of two-thirds of the party caucus (i.e., 48 MPs) to be elected. If no-one can get two-thirds the candidate with the fewest votes would be eliminated. This would continue until someone is elected. Caucus may hold multiple rounds of voting for the final two candidates. If no candidate can be selected, then the leadership will be determined by an electoral college comprising the caucus (40 per cent), party members (40 per cent) and trade unions affiliated to the party (20 per cent), where a simple majority suffices.

Hipkins was the only nominee. His nominators included Michael Wood and Kiri Allan, both of whom were considered by media as prospective leaders. Before Hipkins was confirmed as the candidate, Labour deputy leader Kelvin Davis and deputy prime minister Grant Robertson advised they would not be running. Labour MPs told media they had agreed they would identify a "consensus candidate" who had the support of the whole caucus. In his first media appearance as the presumptive leader, on 21 January Hipkins told media he found out he had his party's unanimous support as "the door to the plane [that he had boarded for a flight to Wellington] was closing," leaving him unable to respond to his messages for 40 minutes.

A caucus meeting, where Hipkins was formally confirmed as Labour leader, occurred on 22 January at 1pm. The Labour Māori caucus, an influential subgroup of 14 MPs, intended to meet on 21 January; but with Hipkins as the only candidate, the meeting was cancelled. Ahead of a scheduled press conference that was timed for two hours after the beginning of the caucus meeting, where the outcome of the election was to be announced, Labour MPs Jenny Salesa and Shanan Halbert confirmed on Twitter that Hipkins would be the new Labour leader with Kelvin Davis staying on as deputy party leader and social development minister Carmel Sepuloni replacing Grant Robertson as deputy prime minister.

Public opinion

News website Stuff conducted a survey the day after Ardern announced her resignation. The survey data is a weighted average, however "due to being an anonymous, public poll, it was possible respondents could have answered the survey multiple times." Curia conducted a scientific online poll on behalf of The Taxpayers' Union.

References

January 2023 events in New Zealand
2023 elections in New Zealand
2023 political party leadership elections
Chris Hipkins
New Zealand Labour Party leadership elections